Sremska Mitrovica railway station is a railway station on Belgrade–Šid railway. Located in Sremska Mitrovica, Serbia. Railroad continued to Martinci in one and the other direction to Voganj.  Sremska Mitrovica railway station consists of 10 railway track.

See also 
 Serbian Railways

References 

Sremska Mitrovica
Railway stations in Vojvodina